The 932nd "Granite" Battalion is part of the Israeli Defense Force's Nahal Brigade.

History
Battalion 932 was established in June 1976 and until Operation Peace for Galilee functioned as a routine security battalion belonging to Central Command. Its main area of activity before the First Lebanon War was the northern sector of the Jordanian border with the West Bank in the Jordan Valley, replacing Sayeret Haruv which had been disbanded. It was based in Camp Gadi, next to Masua, and manned mainly by Nahal soldiers. During the First Lebanon War the battalion participated in the battle for Ein Zahlat against Syrian commandos and a Syrian armored battalion.

Until the withdrawal from Lebanon in 2000 the battalion set up multiple successful outposts and operations, including a cross-border operation, resulting in the elimination of four terrorists, nicknamed "turmeric 3."

The Granite Battalion received the Chief Of Staff (Ramatkal) Medal for its activities during Operation Defensive Shield, especially in the battle for Jenin. During the operation the battalion participated in arrests in Tulkarm, the Balata refugee camp, Nur, Nablus, the refugee camps in Ramallah and Amaary Jenin.

During the Second Lebanon War, Battalion 932 battled Hezbollah fighters in the villages of south Lebanon,  including Meiss Ej Jabal, Rab El Thalathine, Qantara and the famous battle in the village of Ghandouriyeh in Wadi Saluki, towards the end of the war.

In Operation Cast Lead of 2008, Battalion 932 hindered a number of attacks originating from the Lebanese and Syrian borders.

In Operation Protective Edge, Battalion 932 fought in the northern Gaza Strip, combating Hamas militants and finding and destroying arms caches hidden in civilian buildings.

Unit
 "Palmach" (כבוד) Company
 "Miztayen" (ראשון) Company
 Spear Company
 Reconnaissance Company 1
 Sniper Platoons
 Armour Support Company
 "Masayit" (ארמור) Company
 Special Unit (מיאוחד) Platoon
 Cojones (כוחונס) Company
 Reconnaissance Company 2
 "Mater" (אימה) Company
 "Pater" (אבא) Platoon
 Battalion Medical Personnel

References

Battalions of Israel
Military units and formations established in 1976